William Julius "Judy" Johnson House is a historic home located at Marshallton, New Castle County, Delaware. It was built about 1925, and is a two-story, three bay, rectangular frame dwelling with a one-story front porch.  It has a hipped and gable roof with dormer and is reflective of the American Craftsman style. Wavy asbestos siding was added to the home in 1939. Also on the property is a contributing two car garage.  It was the home of Hall of Fame baseball player Judy Johnson (ca. 1900–1989), who played in the Negro leagues between 1921 and 1937.  Johnson purchased the home in 1934, and resided in it until shortly before his death.

It was added to the National Register of Historic Places in 1995.

References

African-American historic places
Houses on the National Register of Historic Places in Delaware
Houses completed in 1925
Houses in New Castle County, Delaware
National Register of Historic Places in New Castle County, Delaware